The 2016 Missouri Republican presidential primary took place March 15 in the U.S. state of Missouri, as a part of the Republican Party's series of presidential primaries ahead of the 2016 United States presidential election. The Missouri primary was held alongside Republican primary elections in Florida, Illinois, North Carolina and Ohio, along with the Democratic contest in Missouri.
The hotly contested primary was won by businessman Donald Trump by a margin of 0.21% over Texas Senator Ted Cruz.

Background
In the 2012 primaries, the state of Missouri held two separate contests, a "beauty contest" primary on February 7 and caucuses beginning on March 15. Missouri Governor Jay Nixon signed SB892 in 2014 to move the state's presidential primary contest to March. In addition, the caucus was removed so the primary counted for delegates. According to Missouri Republican Party chair John Hancock, the move was to encourage candidates to campaign in all parts of the state and to avoid the chaotic convention fights in the 2012 campaign.

The state of the campaign

Previous contests
Despite an early victory by Ted Cruz in the Iowa caucuses, Donald Trump was seen as making steady progress towards the Republican nomination at the time. Trump was victorious in 7 of the contests on March 1, with Cruz seen as the only viable threat to Trump after victories in his home state of Texas and three other March 1 contests. Marco Rubio performed worse than anticipated on March 1, taking only Minnesota. On March 8, two primaries and a caucus were held in Hawaii, Michigan and Mississippi. Despite a poll from American Research Group that showed Kasich leading Trump in Michigan, Trump won all three contests.

Run-up to the election

While there was limited polling in Missouri prior to the primary contest, Ted Cruz and Donald Trump were projected to be the main contenders, with Trump considered to be the favorite. Missouri was considered an important state due to its "winner-take-most" nature, which could allow Trump to accrue a large net gain of delegates with a small change in the popular vote.

Results

Following the March 15 contests, Marco Rubio suspended his campaign, largely due to a poor performance in Florida.

Possible recount
Missouri elections law allows the second-place candidate to request a recount if they are defeated in the election by less than one half of a percent. Speculation arose that Cruz would ask for a recount, as he lost the primary by less than 2,000 votes, or 0.21 percent. However, Cruz decided not to request a recount of the election, thus conceding the primary to Trump.
The recount was considered important because 12 of the 52 delegates to the Republican National Convention were awarded winner-take-all to the winner of the state.

See also
 2016 Missouri Democratic presidential primary

References

Missouri
Republican presidential primary
Missouri Republican primaries